Synanthedon theryi is a moth of the family Sesiidae. It is found in Spain, Portugal, Morocco and Algeria.

The wingspan is 20–22 mm.

The larvae feed on Tamarix africana, Tamarix gallica and Tamarix boveana.

References

Moths described in 1916
Sesiidae